Kestner is a German surname. Notable people with the surname include:

 (Georg Christian) August Kestner (1777, Hanover - 1853), German antiquarian and diplomat
 Kestner-Museum, Hanover, Germany, founded in 1889
 kestnergesellschaft, an art gallery in Hanover, Germany, founded in 1916
 Boyd Kestner (born 1964), American actor
 Charles Kestner (1803 - 1870), German-French chemist and politician
 Charlotte Kestner, née Buff (1753 - 1828), wife of Johann Christian Kestner
 Hermann Kestner (1810 - 1890), German composer
 Jens Kestner (born 1971), German politician
 Johann Christian Kestner (1741 - 1800), German jurist and archivist
 Lars Kestner, American author of financial texts
 Paul Kestner, founded the Kestner company in 1902, now part of the GEA Group

See also 
 Kastner
 Kästner

References 

German-language surnames